The 20/20 Experience World Tour was the fifth concert tour by American singer-songwriter Justin Timberlake. It was launched in support of his third and fourth studio albums, The 20/20 Experience (2013) and The 20/20 Experience – 2 of 2 (2013). The tour began on November 6, 2013 in New York City, and concluded on January 2, 2015 in Las Vegas. The 20/20 Experience World Tour grossed $231.6 million from 128 shows becoming the second highest-grossing tour of 2014, behind One Direction's Where We Are Tour and one of the highest-grossing tours of the decade. This made Timberlake the highest-grossing solo touring artist of the year. It is also Timberlake's most successful tour to date.

Directed by Jonathan Demme, the concert film—titled Justin Timberlake + The Tennessee Kids—premiered on September 13 at the 2016 Toronto International Film Festival. It showcases the final date of the 20/20 tour at Las Vegas’ MGM Grand Garden Arena. The streaming service Netflix announced its acquisition ahead of the film's debut at film festival and released it on October 12, 2016. It was the final film to be directed by Demme before his death in April 2017.

Critical response 
 
Since its debut, The 20/20 Experience World Tour has received acclaim from critics. Writing for the New York Daily News, Jim Farber reviewed the opening show at Barclays Center. Farber described the concert as a "study in suave ease. Starting with 'Pusher Love Girl,' Timberlake exuded a sweatless charm." Hillary Rea for The Philadelphia Inquirer, who attended the tour at the Wells Fargo Center,  noted that Timberlake's performance "kept the audience not just alert, but hypnotized and hooked throughout a 30-song spectacle that ended just before midnight." Fionnuala Bourke in a review for Birmingham Mail opined that Justin "managed to completely keep his cool amid all the screams" and he "proved his position as the President of Pop." The Hollywood Reporter'''s Emily Zemler, described him as a performer who is "genuinely having fun", adding he "knows he's got the looks, but he is also skilled at delivering something that isn't all surface", about the concert at The Forum, Los Angeles. She added: "Onstage, the pop star and actor moves with the sort of confidence that comes only from this knowledge, where it manifests not as ego but as absolute self-assurance.

Jon Pareles of The New York Times also gave a positive review noting that he "reveals something darker" and "something more fiery and intense" while performing post-breakup revenge songs such as "Cry Me a River" and "What Goes Around... Comes Around."

 Costumes 
 Timberlake worked with Tom Ford for the tour's costumes. During their collaboration they have created more than 600 costumes for Timberlake and his team. Most of Timberlake's costumes are black and white colored suits.

Broadcast & recordings

The concert film Justin Timberlake + The Tennessee Kids premiered on Netflix on October 12, 2016. Prior to premiering at the Toronto International Film Festival, Timberlake dedicated the film to Prince. "His influence is all over everyone's music and there's so much that I feel like I've maybe consciously and unconsciously borrowed from him that it felt right", he told E! "It just feels right to dedicate the film to him." The concert film showcases the final date of the 20/20 tour at Las Vegas' MGM Grand Garden Arena.

Demme and Timberlake first met when the director wanted to work with him after watching his work in The Social Network (2010); in the meeting they discussed Talking Heads' concert film Stop Making Sense, directed by Demme and an influence for the singer in his live performances. For Justin Timberlake + The Tennessee Kids, Demme used 14 operated cameras that Declan Quinn, the director of photography, and he deployed over many pre-filming engagements, two other free-floating cameras in the audience and one cameraman onstage with Timberlake. Reviewing the concert film, critic David Rooney from Billboard wrote:

It's noteworthy that after two years and 134 dates on the 20/20 Experience World Tour, the act is drilled to perfection but never robotic. All six dancers combine precision with a personal signature, as do the musicians and singers who frequently step out from behind their 1940s big band-style JT music stands to cut loose. Timberlake is a magnetic performer who moves with twitchy sensuality in his Tom Ford tux. But I could just as easily have watched bespectacled vocalist Jack E. King III get his groove on all night, since there's nothing quite so ecstatically graceful as a heavy-set dude with funk in his bones.

Nigel M. Smith from The Guardian'' noted "his falsetto is on-point throughout, as are his smooth moves – like a blend of Frank Sinatra, Michael Jackson and Prince, to whom the film is dedicated. There's a sexy swagger to Timberlake's onstage personae that never reads as cocksure, largely because of the lavish attention he pays to his band and dancers...  They all look like there's no place they’d rather be, despite it being the end of a grueling two year tour. In an era when machines are largely responsible for the beats that drive pop music, the reverence Timberlake shows for actual instruments is worth endearing. Still, there's no mistaking Timberlake as ring leader." Brian Tallerico of the Roger Ebert website gave the film three-and-a-half out of four stars, and wrote "Demme opens his fantastically entertaining [concert film] by introducing us to the backup players and musicians who have supported the pop star on this two-year tour, but make no mistake, this movie is about the entertainer at its center. While Demme's camera never forgets to allow the other partners in pop to share time, he always comes back to Timberlake, one of the most purely enjoyable musicians around which one could center a concert film. His energy is infectious and his joy about what he's been blessed to do for a living is contagious". On review aggregator website Rotten Tomatoes, the film has an approval rating of 100%, based on 13 reviews, with an average rating of 8.1/10. On Metacritic, the film has a score 81 out of 100, based on 6 reviews, indicating "universal acclaim".

Set list 
The following set list is representative of the show on November 6, 2013. It is not representative of all concerts for the duration of the tour.

"Pusher Love Girl"
"Gimme What I Don't Know (I Want)" / "Rock Your Body"
"Don't Hold the Wall"
"FutureSex/LoveSound"
"Like I Love You" / "Let Me Talk to You (Prelude)"
"My Love"
"TKO"
"Strawberry Bubblegum"
"Summer Love"
"LoveStoned / I Think She Knows (Interlude)"
"Until the End of Time"
"Holy Grail" / "Cry Me a River" 
"Only When I Walk Away"
"True Blood"
"Drink You Away"
"Tunnel Vision"
"Señorita"
"Let the Groove Get In"
"Heartbreak Hotel"
"Not a Bad Thing"
"Human Nature"
"What Goes Around.../...Comes Around (Interlude)"
"Cabaret"
"Take Back the Night"
"Jungle Boogie" / "Murder" / "Poison"
"Suit & Tie"
"SexyBack"
Encore
"Mirrors"

Tour dates

Personnel
Credits and personnel are taken from the Justin Timberlake's official website.

Lead Singer
Justin Timberlake

Dancers
Dana Wilson
Ivan Koumaev
Lyle Beniga
Lindsay Richardson
Natalie Gilmore
Matt Aylward
Nick Bass

Backup Singers 
Zenya Bashford 
Aaron Camper
Erin Stevenson
Jack E. King
Nicole Hurst
 
Band
Adam Blackstone (Music Director, Bass)
Elliott Ives (Guitar)
Mike Scott (Guitar)
Eric Smith (Bass)
Charlie Orias (Bass/Backup)
Dontae Winslow (Trumpet)
Sean Erick (Trumpet, The Regiment Horns)
Justin Gilbert (Keyboard Player)
Brian Frasier-Moore (Drums)
Daniel Jones (Keyboard)
Kevin Williams (Trombone, flute, tuba, The Regiment Horns)
Terry Santiel (Percussionist)
Leon Silva (Saxophonist, The Regiment Horns)

Engineers
Danny Cheung (Protools)

Notes

See also 
 List of highest-grossing concert tours

References

External links
  (Netflix)
 

Justin Timberlake concert tours
2013 concert tours
2014 concert tours
2015 concert tours
Netflix specials
Films directed by Jonathan Demme
Concert films